The Irving K. Barber Learning Centre (IKBLC) is a facility at the Vancouver campus of the University of British Columbia. The Learning Centre is built around the refurbished core of the 1925 UBC Main Library. The Centre is named for Irving. K. Barber, philanthropist and a graduate of UBC.

Programs and services
The IKBLC provides library systems, education centre, library and a conduit of knowledge for lifelong learners and space for UBC Library's print collection and collections of rare and special materials.

BC History Digitization Program
Started in 2006, the goal of the digitization program is to promote access to British Columbia's historical resources, with free online access to provincial historical materials.

Indigitization 
The Indigitization program supports Indigenous communities and organizations in British Columbia to digitize their cultural heritage materials by providing grant funding and digitization training. The program is unique as it prioritizes communities' needs and ensures that communities retain copyright and control over their cultural heritage materials. Indigitization is a joint project of IKBLC, the Museum of Anthropology, the iSchool at UBC, and Northern BC Archives (at UNBC), and continuously receives feedback from Indigenous project partners and grantees through initiatives such as the Indigenous Futures Forum held in 2016.

Multimedia repository
Webcasts of lectures are archived and accessible through the Webcasts Portal.

Chapman Learning Commons
The Chapman Learning Commons, in a refurbished central section of the Learning Centre, provides space for group work as well as seating for individual study. It provides support and services for research and information literacy instruction, writing assistance, learning skills programs and technology through one-to-one help, workshops, peer mentoring and virtual resources and services.

Facilities
 Music, Art & Architecture Library
 Collection space for 2,100,000 volumes including open stack shelving and 1,800,000 item capacity with the Automated Storage and Retrieval System (ASRS)
 Rare Books and Special Collections
 Climate-controlled vault for rare books and archives
 The Wallace B. and Madeline H. Chung Collection
 iSchool@UBC: School of Library, Archival and Information Studies (iSchool)
 Center for Teaching, Learning and Technology (CTLT)
 Gateway Programs – Arts One, Science One, Coordinated Arts and Coordinated Science
 Dodson and Lillooet Rooms
 157-seat Victoria Learning Theatre
 Classrooms, seminar rooms, project rooms, boardrooms
 Ridington Reading Room and Musqueam Reading Room
 Ike’s Café with a seating capacity of more than 80 persons

External links

 UBC Learning Commons
 Chapman Learning Commons
 Indigitization

References

University of British Columbia
University of British Columbia libraries
Academic libraries in Canada